= Engineering in the Ancient World =

Engineering in the Ancient World is a book written by J.G. Landels.

== Contents ==
Engineering in the Ancient World is a book in which the engineering achievements of the Greeks and Romans are explored, which remained unmatched until the Renaissance. The book covers energy sources, water supplies, cranes, catapults, ships, land transportation, and insights from classical writers on technical matters. Each chapter provides practical applications.

== Reception ==
William A. Barton reviewed Engineering in the Ancient World for Different Worlds magazine and stated that "A drawback to this otherwise valuable work is the occasional tendency for Landels to become somewhat technical in parts. If you are uncomfortable with engineering writing, you'll have to push yourself a bit, but the effort will be rewarded, especially later in the catapult chapter. The other fault that I could find is that Landels doesn't treat metal-working. [...] If you want to go further in the subject of ancient technology, Landels has an excellent bibliography."
